The Laramie Project is a 2000 play by Moisés Kaufman and members of the Tectonic Theater Project (specifically, Leigh Fondakowski, writer-director; Stephen Belber, Greg Pierotti, Barbara Pitts, Stephen Wangh, Amanda Gronich, Sara Lambert, John McAdams, Maude Mitchell, Andy Paris, and Kelli Simpkins) about the reaction to the 1998 murder of gay University of Wyoming student Matthew Shepard in Laramie, Wyoming. The murder was denounced as a hate crime and brought attention to the lack of hate crime laws in various states, including Wyoming.

An example of verbatim theatre, the play draws on hundreds of interviews conducted by the theatre company with inhabitants of the town, company members' own journal entries, and published news reports. It is divided into three acts, and eight actors portray more than sixty characters in a series of short scenes.

Performances
The Laramie Project premiered at The Ricketson Theatre by the Denver Center Theatre Company (Denver) (part of the Denver Center for the Performing Arts) in February 2000. It was next performed in the Union Square Theatre in New York City before a November 2002 performance in Laramie, Wyoming. The play has also been performed by high schools, colleges, and community theaters across the country. It has been produced at professional playhouses in the United States, Canada, the United Kingdom, Ireland, Australia, and New Zealand.

Many of the performances in the United States have been picketed by followers of Fred Phelps from the Westboro Baptist Church. They are portrayed in the play picketing Matthew Shepard's funeral as they did in real life. 

The play has been produced worldwide in the years since its premiere. But in 2009 it still generated controversy in Colorado and Las Vegas, Nevada, where some parents tried to block a production.

The holder of the royalties/rights to The Laramie Project is Dramatists Play Service, Inc. The Matthew Shepard Foundation provides help and resources for those wishing to produce The Laramie Project or The Laramie Project: Ten Years Later. The Foundation's Laramie Project Specialist can help with media, historical context, creative consulting, and other resources and services at no charge to non-profit theatres and educational and religious institutions. The Foundation can also help those who wish to engage their communities in a conversation about how to erase hate in the world.

Actors
Notable actors/actresses who have performed in The Laramie Project include Van Hansis, Mary Beth Peil, Jenna Ushkowitz, Laura Linney, Joshua Jackson, Stephanie March, Peter Hermann, Peter Fonda, Camryn Manheim, Daniel de Weldon, Cyndi Lauper, Clea DuVall, Christina Ricci, Judith Light, Terry Kinney, Frances Sternhagen, Brian Kerwin, Robert Desiderio, Chad Allen, Stockard Channing, Darren Criss, Andrew Garfield, Amy Madigan.

Combating homophobia

The Laramie Project is often used as a method to teach about prejudice and tolerance in personal, social, and health education and citizenship in schools, and it has also been used in the UK as a General Certificate of Secondary Education text for English literature.

The play has also inspired grassroots efforts to combat homophobia. After seeing the play, New Jersey resident Dean Walton was inspired to donate more than 500 books and other media to the University of Wyoming's Rainbow Resource Center. Today, that campus office houses the largest LGBTQ library in the state of Wyoming.

Film

As a result of the play's success, HBO commissioned a 2002 film of The Laramie Project, also written and directed by Kaufman.

Return to Laramie

Ten years after Shepard's murder, members of Tectonic Theater Project returned to Laramie to conduct follow-up interviews with residents featured in the play. Those interviews were the basis of a companion piece, entitled The Laramie Project: Ten Years Later. The play debuted as a reading at nearly 150 theatres across the US and internationally on October 12, 2009 – the 11th anniversary of Matthew Shepard's death. Many of the openings were linked by webcam to New York City, where Judy Shepard, Matthew's mother, and the play's producers and writers gave an opening speech, followed by an address by actress Glenn Close. Daniel DeWeldon played Aaron McKinney opposite Barbara Bain in the Los Angeles production at Grand Performances, directed by Michael Arabian.

The Laramie Project: Ten Years Later was presented for the first time in rep with The Laramie Project at the BAM Harvey Theater from February 12–24, 2013 as part of an event titled The Laramie Project Cycle. Directed by Kaufman and Leigh Fondakowski, the production featured much of the original cast reprising their roles.

See also

Violence against LGBT people
Matthew Shepard Foundation
Cultural depictions of Matthew Shepard

References

External links
 
 The Tectonic Theater Project's website
 Dramatists Play Service, Inc.
 The University of Wyoming Rainbow Resource Center
 Interview with Leigh Fondakowski by Peter Shea
 Laramie Project Support through the Matthew Shepard Foundation

2000 plays
Docudrama plays
LGBT-related plays
Works about Matthew Shepard
Plays based on actual events
Plays by Moisés Kaufman
Plays by Stephen Belber
Plays set in the 1990s
Plays set in Wyoming
Stonewall Book Award-winning works
2000s LGBT literature